Hotel Artemis is a 2018 American film written and directed by Drew Pearce, in his feature film directorial debut. It stars Jodie Foster, Sterling K. Brown, Sofia Boutella, Jeff Goldblum, Charlie Day, Brian Tyree Henry, Jenny Slate, Dave Bautista, and Zachary Quinto. The plot follows Jean Thomas, a nurse who runs a secret hospital for criminals in futuristic Los Angeles. It was released in the United States on June 8, 2018. The film received mixed reviews from critics, who praised its visual style, intriguing screenplay and acting (particularly Foster's) but found the execution poor. It was a box office bomb, only grossing $13 million against a budget of $15 million.

Plot 
On June 21, 2028, a riot breaks out in Los Angeles over the city's water privatization. Taking advantage of the chaos, professional criminal Sherman attempts a bank robbery that leaves half his team dead with his brother Lev and another accomplice critically wounded. During the robbery, Lev takes a fancy pen from a well-dressed bank customer who tells Lev he is making a terrible mistake. They escape to the nearby Hotel Artemis, a secretive hospital that treats only criminals, run by Jean "the Nurse" Thomas. Confined inside the hotel for 22 years by her severe agoraphobia and grief over the death of her son, Thomas adheres to a strict set of rules for the hospital, including "No weapons", "No non-members", and "No killing of other guests".

Sherman and Lev are admitted while their accomplice is forcibly ejected by Thomas' assistant, Everest. Lev, given the codename "Honolulu", undergoes the hotel's technologically advanced treatment, including robot-assisted surgery and 3D printed transplant organs. Sherman encounters the hotel's other guests: "Acapulco", an obnoxious arms dealer, and "Nice", an international assassin and old acquaintance. As the riot draws nearer, Thomas receives word that notorious crime lord Orian "The Wolf King" Franklin, who is also the owner of the Hotel, is en route. Thomas' preparations are complicated by the arrival of a wounded police officer named Morgan, a childhood friend of Thomas' late son, begging for help. Against Everest's warnings and Thomas' own rules, they admit Morgan.

Thomas shows Sherman evidence that his brother Lev is a drug addict. Through aid from Nice, Sherman discovers the pen Lev stole is marked with the Wolf King's symbol and conceals diamonds worth over $18 million. The Wolf King has a strict policy of killing those who steal from him by dumping them in the ocean. Fearful of being discovered, Sherman prepares to fight the Wolf King's men until his brother is stable enough to move. The Wolf King arrives, having survived an attempt on his life, and is admitted, leaving his men and son Crosby in the lobby. Everest sneaks Morgan out of the hotel after treating her wounds. Acapulco learns that Nice has been hired to kill the Wolf King; she incapacitates Acapulco and plants a bomb on the hotel's power generator.

While administering to the Wolf King, Thomas discovers that he was responsible for her son's death. While the police reported he died due to an overdose, her son was killed after attempting to steal the Wolf King's car. The Wolf King paid the police to lie about her son's death and used the tragedy to recruit Nurse Thomas to run Hotel Artemis. Thomas prepares to kill the Wolf King, but is diverted when Nice's bomb disrupts the power and Lev's life support. While Thomas struggles to save Lev, Nice kills the Wolf King. Lev dies and Sherman confronts Nice, but the two are attacked by Acapulco; Sherman is shot but manages to kill him.

As rioters storm the streets outside, Thomas, Sherman, and Nice make their way out of the hotel, while Everest stays behind to stave off the Wolf King's men; Nice follows suit, covering Thomas and Sherman's escape. The two are met by Crosby, but kill him and make their way through the riot to Sherman's getaway car. Thomas decides to stay to give medical aid to the rioters, but tells Sherman of another hotel, the Apache in Las Vegas, before he drives off.

Everest, the last man standing at the Artemis, turns on the hotel's sign as Thomas walks away from the hotel.

In a mid-credits scene, a shadowy figure runs across the screen, suggesting Nice may have also survived.

Cast
 Jodie Foster as Jean Thomas / The Nurse
 Sterling K. Brown as Sherman / Waikiki
 Sofia Boutella as Nice 
 Jeff Goldblum as Orian "The Wolf King" Franklin / Niagara
 Brian Tyree Henry as Lev / Honolulu
 Jenny Slate as Officer Morgan Daniels
 Zachary Quinto as Crosby Franklin
 Charlie Day as Acapulco
 Dave Bautista as Everest
 Kenneth Choi as Buke
 Josh Tillman as P-22
 Evan Jones as "Trojan" Nash
 Nathan Davis Jr. as Rocco

Production
Development on the project began in November 2016, when it was announced Jodie Foster would star in the film with a script to be written and directed by Drew Pearce. Lionsgate acquired the international distribution rights to the film at the 2017 Berlin Film Festival, with WME Global dealing with the North American release.

Filming started in downtown Los Angeles in May 2017 and lasted 33 days.

Release
Before filming began Lionsgate acquired the international distribution rights to Hotel Artemis at the 2017 Berlin Film Festival, with WME Global dealing with the North American release.

The film was released on June 8, 2018. It had its premiere on May 19, 2018 at the Regency Village Theater in Westwood, Los Angeles. To promote the film, Global Road Entertainment released a set of character posters, each featuring an homage to a famous literary or film reference from Los Angeles, such as Sterling K. Brown merged into the book cover for Raymond Chandler's novel The Long Goodbye and Charlie Day merged into the film poster for American Gigolo.

Reception

Box office

In the United States and Canada, the film was released alongside Ocean's 8 and Hereditary, and was initially projected to gross $5–9 million from 2,340 theaters in its opening weekend. However, after making $1.1 million on Friday (including $271,000 from Thursday night previews), estimates were lowered to $3 million. It went on to debut to $3.2 million, finishing eighth at the box office. The film fell 69% in its second weekend to $1 million, finishing 14th. In its third week of release the film was pulled from 92.8% of theaters (2,299 to 163) and grossed just $72,151, marking the 28th-largest third-week theater drop in history.

Critical response

The website's critical consensus reads, "Hotel Artemis has a few flashes of wit and an intriguing cast, but mostly it's just a serviceable chunk of slightly futuristic violence—which might be all its audience is looking for." On Metacritic, which assigns a normalized rating to reviews, the film has a weighted average score of 58 out of 100, based on 36 critics, indicating "mixed or average reviews". Audiences polled by CinemaScore gave the film a grade of "C−" on an A+ to F scale.

Mick LaSalle of the San Francisco Chronicle praised the first time director and screenwriter for balancing "absurdity, but also the consequences". LaSalle further praised the film for "its genuine thrills, terrific cast and strong performances."

Richard Roeper of the Chicago Sun-Times praised the cast and the filmmakers attempt to do something different but was disappointed that the film is "all too predictable and familiar".

Foster's performance received positive reviews and particular attention from critics. Empire's Jonathan Pile said, "Foster gives a performance to treasure—tough on the surface, but conveying an unshakeable sadness", while Screen Rant's Sandy Schaefer called her the film's best part and said: she naturally gets the meatiest role here as Nurse—whose dry humor masks her struggles with anxiety and a past she cannot escape. Vulture's Emily Yoshida said, "Foster, dowdied up and forever shuffling around from room to room, toting a portable record player and headphones, is a massive pleasing anchor amid all the more flashy bullet exchanges and flying kicks that inevitably break out." The San Francisco Chronicle's Mick LaSalle said, "Not enough can be said about the performance of Foster in this film. She brings to the role a quality of having seen the absolute worst in people, but also the suggestion that, as a result, she accepts them on their own terms and knows how to handle any situation. So she starts the film radiating confidence and sadness, and then, as the story wears on, a creeping sense of panic." Rick Bentley from the Tampa Bay Times declared Foster's performance as Oscar-worthy and said, "she transforms herself from her world-weary face to a way of shuffling when she walks that suggests a life of pain and suffering ignored to spend more time helping others. This is one of the Oscar-winner’s best and most memorable performances.*"

References

External links
 
 Hotel Artemis on Fandango

2018 action thriller films
American action thriller films
American crime thriller films
Cyberpunk films
American dystopian films
Films produced by Marc E. Platt
Films scored by Cliff Martinez
Films set in 2028
Films set in hotels
Films set in Los Angeles
Films shot in Los Angeles
Films with screenplays by Drew Pearce
2018 directorial debut films
2010s English-language films
2010s American films